La Tremenda may refer to the following Spanish radio stations in Mexico and United States:

In Mexico
 La Tremenda 106.5, an FM pirate radio station in Nuevo Laredo, Tamaulipas
 XEDD-AM, an AM radio station in Montemorelos, Nuevo León
 XERP-AM, an AM radio station in Tampico, Tamaulipas
 XESDD-AM, an AM radio station in Tijuana, Baja California
 XHCJZ-FM, an FM radio station in Ciudad Jimenez, Chihuahua
 XHCU-FM, an FM radio station in Morelos
 XHDNG-FM, an FM radio station in Durango, Durango
 XHTOM-FM, an FM radio station in Toluca, Mexico

In United States
 KLAT, an AM radio station in Houston, Texas
 WCEO, an AM radio station in Columbia, South Carolina
 WFAY, an AM radio station in Fayetteville, North Carolina
 WGSP/WGSP-FM, AM and FM stations in Charlotte, North Carolina
 WVOJ, an AM radio station in Jacksonville, Florida